Ally Charlotte Center is a 2-building development in Uptown Charlotte, North Carolina. The office building was officially completed on May 3, 2021, it stands at a height of 378 (115.2). Each floor  has an open floor plan and averages approximately 30,000 square feet in size for a total of 742,000 square feet of space which makes it the tenth largest building in Charlotte by leasable space. The site features a 381-room JW Marriott hotel including 34 suites, the first JW Marriott in North Carolina.  The site also includes 25,000 square feet of restaurant and retail space, and an 8-story parking garage with 1,400 parking spots.

History 

Ally Financial began plans for the building in 2013.  Initially the building was called Tryon Place.  Prior to Ally's announced occupancy of the building Duke Energy was rumored to be the anchor tenant.  However, the company choose to build Duke Energy Plaza as their new headquarters.  Ally was planning to occupy only 400,000 square feet.  In March 2014 Crescent Communities released more specifics plans for the building. Initially it was planned to be a 27-story office building with 500,000 to 1 million square feet of space on a 3-acre lot.  Also, in March 2014 Crescent purchased the 3.6-acre site from the city of Charlotte for $10.3 million.  At the time it was one of five surplus right-of-way parcels the city acquired from N.C. Department of Transportation after the modifications to the Interstate 277/South Caldwell Street interchange.

The building is located on the former proposed site of Trump Charlotte.  The proposed Trump building would have been a mixed-use containing condos, high end shops, office space, and a five star hotel.  The building was planned to be 72 stories would have been taller than the city's current tallest building, Bank of America Corporate Center.

The site of the JW Marriott was once home to the Query-Spivey-McGee Building.  It was constructed in 1902 to function as a feed, seed, and gardening store into the 1980's.  It also functioned as stables, several agricultural supply stores, an auto mechanic shop, a mattress and upholstery store, a gardening supply store, and the final use was the law firm of James, McElroy & Diehl.  In Charlotte's early history Uptown served as a meeting place for farmers.  The building's site was purchased by Crescent in 2018 for $6 million and torn down in March 2018.

Office building

Currently Ally Financial occupies 725,000 square feet of the building and is one of two office tenants of the building, the other being Crescent Communities.  All 2,100 Charlotte-based employees and contractors will relocate to the new building from other Charlotte offices, which includes 440 South Church, 11605 N. Community House Road, WeWork space at 128 S. Tryon St, 1401 W. Morehead St, and 2101 Rexford Road. Ally will move into the building in phases as determined by teams.

In July 2021, Crescent sold the building to an affiliate of Ally Financial for $390 million in one of the largest building sales in Charlotte history.

In September 2022 Crescent Communities, the building's developer, moved into new headquarters in the building occupying 30,000 square feet on the eighth floor. The space was designed to highlight the company's history and story.  Many of the materials used in the space's construction highlight past development projects.  The space is also designed to facilitate collaboration with several spots such as team rooms or workspaces, throughout the office that feature collaborative technology, breaking barriers to virtual work and easing the connection to Crescent offices in other cities. At the time of the announcement Crescent had 100 local employees.

JW Marriott 
In January 2018 White Lodging, based in Merrillville, Ind. was announced as developing a 350 hotel on the 3.6-acre lot next to the office tower.  Unfortunately, the hotel portion of the lot is not large enough for a convention center hotel, which is usually 800 to 1,000 rooms and could partially subsidized with taxpayer money.  The Westin Charlotte with 700 rooms is Charlotte's largest hotel, built in 2003, and it received $16 million in taxpayer funding.  After a two-year national search Crescent selected White Lodging because of their ideas about building at the street and its food and beverage program.

White Lodging and Crescent Communities have developed the 22 story, 320,000 square foot hotel together.  It topped out in June 2020. The hotel opened in August 2021. It is the 7th largest hotel in Charlotte by number of rooms with 381 rooms. JW Marriott is a luxury brand of Marriott International.  It features modern guest rooms, spas, sizable co-working spaces, and bars with outdoor seating.

The hotel features 3 restaurants: Dean's Italian Steakhouse, Caroline's Oyster Bar, and Aura Rooftop Bar. In May 2021, it was announced that 300 people would be hired to staff the restaurants with hired events in early May.  The goal of the restaurants is to offer exceptional urban dinning.

See also
 List of tallest buildings in North Carolina / the United States / the world
 List of tallest buildings in Charlotte, North Carolina

References

Skyscraper office buildings in Charlotte, North Carolina
Skyscrapers in Charlotte, North Carolina